Cartmel Priory CofE School is a mixed 11-16 secondary school and academy in Cartmel, Cumbria, England.

History
The school was opened in 1958 on land given by Lord Richard Cavendish built with money from the Church and the local community.  The school was officially opened on 15 October 1958 by Her Royal Highness, The Princess Margaret.

References

External links
 Cartmel Priory CofE School

Church of England secondary schools in the Diocese of Carlisle
Educational institutions established in 1958
1958 establishments in England
Secondary schools in Cumbria
Academies in Cumbria
Cartmel